EKB may refer to:
 East Kentucky Broadcasting, an American television network
 Egyptian Knowledge Bank, an Egyptian educational database
 Ekibastuz Airport, in Kazakhstan
 Eskbank railway station, in Scotland
 National Housing Authority (Albania)
 Yekaterinburg, a city in Russia